"When a Child Is Born" is a popular Christmas song. The original melody was "Soleado", a tune from 1974 by Ciro Dammicco (alias Zacar), composer for Italy's Daniel Sentacruz Ensemble, and Dario Baldan Bembo. The tune was based on Damicco's earlier tune "Le rose blu" published in 1972. The English language lyrics were written a few years later by Fred Jay (Friedrich Alex Jacobson IPI number 00015195204, who wrote many hits for Boney M such as Rasputin and Ma Baker). They do not make specific mention of Christmas. Fred Jay's lyrics have been sung by many artists, first version by Michael Holm in 1974 but most successfully by Johnny Mathis in 1976, whose version was the Christmas number one of that year in the UK.

Performances
"Soleado" is used in the 1975 Argentinean film Nazareno Cruz y el lobo (The Love of the Wolf), and it is credited as "Theme From the Motion Picture 'The Love of the Wolf'" on Mathis's album Johnny Mathis Sings the Movie Greats (CBS). Artists who have performed the song include:

ACM Gospel Choir in their 2008 Mail on Sunday giveaway CD Christmas with the Choir
Boney M. in their 1981 Christmas Album
Bing Crosby included in his album Beautiful Memories (1976)
Cissy Houston
Lutricia McNeal who reached the UK top twenty in 1998
G4
Matt Monro
Judy Collins in her 1987 album Trust Your Heart
Kamahl
Kenny Rogers
Sarah Brightman in her 2008 holiday CD A Winter Symphony
Charlotte Church in her 2000 holiday CD Dream a Dream
Tarja Turunen
Willie Nelson
Paulini
Il Divo, in their 2005 album The Christmas Collection.
The Moody Blues (UK) appears on their 2003 album December.
Michael Holm (Germany)  (also see below). The original 1974-75 US chart single.
Billy T James (New Zealand)
Tarja Turunen (Finland)
Lee Towers (Netherlands)
Mireille Mathieu (France)
Andrea Bocelli (Italy)
Plácido Domingo (Spain)
Sissel Kyrkjebø (Norway)
Demis Roussos (Egypt/Greece/Europe) 
Australian singer Alfio recorded a version of this song in 2006 for his debut album Tranquillita: The Christmas Edition
Chinese singer Albert Au also recorded the song in English
Filipino singer José Mari Chan covered the song on his holiday album, Christmas in Our Hearts.
Frank Patterson (Irish)
Connie Talbot, a contestant from Britain's Got Talent included it in two albums:  Connie Talbot's Christmas Album in 2008 and Connie Talbot's Holiday Magic in 2009.
Joe McElderry for his third studio album, Classic Christmas.
Jai Waetford on his debut album after he comes in third place at The X Factor Australia in 2013
 Cilla Black from the 1980 album Especially For You
 John Holt (Jamaica)
Father Ray Kelly (Ireland) on his album "An Irish Christmas Blessing" 2015
 Mark 'Oh as Tears Don't Lie in 1994
 Cliff Richard included it in two albums: Cliff at Christmas in 2003, and Christmas with Cliff in 2022.

Johnny Mathis version

The best-known version of the song is probably the Jack Gold-produced version for Johnny Mathis. Entitled "When A Child Is Born (Soleado)" with B-side as "Every Time You Touch Me (I Get High)", it became Johnny Mathis' sole number one single in the UK Singles Chart, spending three weeks at the top of the chart in December 1976, including the coveted Christmas number one slot, and selling 885,000 copies. In the US, it appeared in the Record World survey in both the Christmas seasons of 1976 and 1977, reaching a maximum position of No. 123, and racking up 10 chart weeks. In addition, Mathis re-recorded the song as a duet with Gladys Knight and the Pips. This version reached Record World No. 137 during the Christmas season of 1980 and the UK Singles Chart at No. 79.

Language versions
In 1974, the melody was sung with Spanish lyrics by Manolo Otero and entitled "Todo el tiempo del mundo" (translation: All The Time Of The World).
The same melody was used with German lyrics by Michael Holm in "Tränen lügen nicht" (translation: Tears Don't Lie) in 1974. In German, the song is totally unrelated to Christmas. The singer asks a guy to reconsider breaking up with his girl because her tears don't lie. 
Michael Holm recorded a new version of "Tränen lugen nicht" for the International market, with new lyrics in English by Fred Jay, "When A Child Is Born". That version was a minor hit in the US, reaching #53 on Billboard's Hot 100, #7 on Billboard's Easy Listening Top 50. The tune was used for Mark 'Oh's 1995 dance hit, also called "Tears Don't Lie".
In 1975 the melody was used with French language lyrics, written by Henri Dijan and sung by Mireille Mathieu "On ne vit pas sans se dire adieu" (translation: "We can't go on living without our saying farewell"). The lyrics completely changed to a story about a 16-year-old girl whose love was denied by the boys father, whose son was expected to marry a better woman after his education and military service.
It was sung with Hungarian lyrics by Zsuzsa Cserháti "Édes kisfiam" ("My sweet son"). In 1975 Iván Bradányi wrote the lyrics of this song for Cserháti after her son was born.
Turkish star Nese Karabocek sang this song with Turkish language lyrics. It was titled "Gozyaslari yalan soylemez" (Tears don't lie)
Czech star Karel Gott sang it with Zdeněk Borovec's lyrics "Měl jsem rád a mám" ("I loved and I still do") — the singer remembers in the song lyrics about his old girlfriends.
Polish band Perfect sang it with Polish language lyrics "Bóg narodzi się".
 Vera Lynn (English), with different lyrics, the song is called "There Comes a Day" (1975).  
In 1978, Hong Kong singer Roman Tam had used the music of 'When a child is born' to create a song called 'Love at Tomorrow' and it's recorded in his VCD called 'The death party'.
 In 1981, Spanish singer Mari Trini used the melody to write the song with the title "Te amaré, Te amo y Te querré" (I'll love you, I love you and I'll love you) on her album "Oraciones de Amor" (Love Prayers)
 In Latvia this song with different lyrics is called "Viens noburts vārds". The song is performed by Rita Trence and Imants Skrastiņš.
 In Denmark it was sung by the group Bamses Venner - Tårer Taler Sandt (Tears Speak The Truth) (perhaps a translation of the German version).
 The Greek version (different words) was sung by George Fanaras
 The Chinese version (约) was sung by Xu Chi/ASAPH, a Chinese Christian soul worship singer
 The Vietnamese version (The Happiness Boat) was sung by Ngoc Huong
 There are at least two well known versions of this song in Finnish.
The first Finnish version of the song is called 'Lähdit taakse pilvien' ("You left behind the clouds") and was released by Kisu in 1976. This version of the song has also been sung by Juhani Markola and Tapani Kansa, amongst others. This version is not Christmas related but instead is about death and longing.
The other version is called Jos joulu jää sydämeen (if Christmas stays in the heart) was released by Timo T. A. Mikkonen in 1989. It has been sung also by Finlanders and Tomi Metsäketo among others. This version is Christmas related focusing on peace.

References

1976 singles
UK Singles Chart number-one singles
Johnny Mathis songs
Connie Talbot songs
Christmas carols
1972 songs
CBS Records singles
Songs about Jesus
Songs written by Dario Baldan Bembo